Ricardo Lucas Figueredo Monte Raso, known as Dodô (born 2 May 1974 in São Paulo), is a Brazilian football coach and former footballer who played as a striker.

Career
Dodô has played for several clubs in Brazil, including São Paulo, Santos, Botafogo and Fluminense. He also spent time in Japan, South Korea and the UAE, enjoying success with Ulsan Hyundai Horangi in the K-League.

On 11 September 2008, the Court of Arbitration for Sport suspended Dodô from playing professional football for two years as a result of a failed doping test. He tested positive for the use of Fenproporex following a match between Botofogo and Vasco da Gama on 14 June 2007.

In January 2010, after the suspension has finished, Dodô signed a contract with Vasco da Gama for his comeback to football. Dodô scored 11 goals in 28 appearances for the club, four in a single match against Botafogo. However, two penalties missed on the derby against Flamengo, ended his spell with the club.

On 14 June 2010, Dodô transferred to Portuguesa and announced his wishes to end his career in the club.

On 27 April 2011, he was keen to extend his career and signed a one-year deal with Americana

He was still by the Grêmio Osasco in February 2013 and one month after hit with Barra da Tijuca in the dispute of the Campeonato Carioca Série B

Without act since 2013, Dodo has a course to coach at the beginning of this year taught by CBF, with duration of ten days and classes divided into two periods and after that conclusion, cmo debut coach in Rio Negro.

Club statistics

National team statistics

Honours
Paraná State Championship: 1996
São Paulo State Championship: 1998
Rio de Janeiro State Championship: 2006

Personal honours
São Paulo State League's top scorer: 1997
Rio-São Paulo Tournament's top scorer: 1998
Rio de Janeiro State League's top scorer: 2006, 2007

International goals
Results list Brazil's goal tally first.

References

External links

 
 
 
youtube.com 
Botafogo libera atletas antes do fim do Brasileirão 

 

1974 births
Living people
Association football forwards
Brazilian footballers
Brazilian football managers
Brazilian expatriate footballers
Brazil international footballers
Campeonato Brasileiro Série A players
K League 1 players
J1 League players
Expatriate footballers in South Korea
Expatriate footballers in Japan
Expatriate footballers in the United Arab Emirates
Footballers from São Paulo
Brazilian expatriate sportspeople in South Korea
Brazilian expatriate sportspeople in Japan
Brazilian sportspeople in doping cases
Brazilian expatriate sportspeople in the United Arab Emirates
Doping cases in association football
Nacional Atlético Clube (SP) players
Fluminense FC players
São Paulo FC players
Paraná Clube players
Santos FC players
Botafogo de Futebol e Regatas players
Sociedade Esportiva Palmeiras players
Ulsan Hyundai FC players
Oita Trinita players
Goiás Esporte Clube players
CR Vasco da Gama players
Associação Portuguesa de Desportos players
Guaratinguetá Futebol players
Al Ain FC players
Atlético Rio Negro Clube managers
UAE Pro League players